Mahmoud Karimi (Persian: محمود کریمی) is an Iranian Maddah  

Maddah who was born on 13 June 1968  in Tehran; his father is considered among Iranian missing combatants (during Iran-Iraq war), and his brother was killed in 1985 during "Operation Karbala 5" in Shalamcheh. Mahmoud Karimi got married in 1991 and has 2 children (a son and a daughter).

It has been mentioned in regards to Mahmoud Karimi's occupation that he is self-employed, and is working related-industrial activities. Karimi mentions that he has studied at Allameh Tabataba'i University
at the subject of "industrial management" but he left it after passing 74 university credits; and preferred to be active at cultural front/issues, thus he entered cultural/maddahi fields.

This Iranian Maddah who is also known as "Haj Mahmoud Karimi", has performed diverse Maddahis and mourning, and has presented various maddahi albums/Nohas, too. He also has held maddahis/dhikrs in the "office of the supreme leader of Iran".

See also 
 Sadiq Ahangaran
 Saeed Haddadian

References

20th-century Iranian male singers
Maddahs
21st-century Iranian male singers